Winona Kapuailohiamanonokalani Desha Beamer (August 15, 1923 – April 10, 2008) was a champion of authentic and ancient Hawaiian culture, publishing many books, musical scores, as well as audio and video recordings on the subject. In her home state, she was known as Auntie Nona. She was an early proponent of the ancient form of the hula being perpetuated through teaching and public performances. Beamer was the granddaughter of Helen Desha Beamer. A cousin to Hawaiian Music Hall of Fame inductee Mahi Beamer, she teamed with him and her son Keola to form a touring North American troupe performing ancient hula and the Hawaiian art of storytelling. She was a teacher at Kamehameha Schools for almost 40 years, but had been expelled from that same school as a student in 1937 for dancing the standing hula. Beamer's sons Keola and Kapono are established performers in the Hawaiian music scene. Her grandson Kamanamaikalani Beamer is a professor at the University of Hawaii at Manoa and CEO of the Kohala Center. She ran a Waikiki hula studio for three decades. In 1997—indignant at proposals to cut Hawaiian curriculum from Kamehameha Schools—Beamer became the catalyst for public protest and legal investigation into Bishop Estate management, which eventually led to the removal or resignation of the trustees.

Early life and background
She was born Winona Kapuailohiamanonokalani Desha Beamer to Pono and Louise Beamer on August 15, 1923, in Honolulu, United States Territory of Hawaii (a state since 1959). Much of her early life was spent on the island of Hawaii, under the guidance and tutelage of her grandmother, Helen Desha Beamer, who taught her hula at about the age of three.

As the cultural influence of the United States began to be felt on the territory, Beamer began to get more intensely involved in Hawaii's cultural heritage. Before she was a teenager, Beamer was composing meles by adding melodies to ancient chants. She attended Colorado Women's College, Barnard College, and Columbia University, studying anthropology.

Beamer is credited with coining the term "Hawaiiana" as early as 1948. In 1949, she became a high school instructor of Hawaiian culture at Kamehameha Schools, and served in that position for almost 40 years.

Hula and Hawaiian storytelling
Beamer was briefly expelled in 1937 from the Kamehameha Schools for performing a standing hula. When Kamehameha Schools was established through the 1883 will of Bernice Pauahi Bishop, the original trustees of the Bishop Estate were Charles R. Bishop, Charles McEwen Hyde, Samuel M. Damon, Charles Montague Cooke, and William Owen Smith, who were either missionaries, or had ties to those in the profession. They found the hula too suggestive and had banned it from being performed at the school. The standing hula was not allowed to be performed on campus until the 1960s.

Beamer was a pivotal influence in reviving the art of the ancient hula, in the face of a more commercialized version invented for the tourism trade in Hawaii. Beamer, her cousin Mahi Beamer, and her brother, Keola, formed their own touring North American dance troupe to promote the authentic ancient hula and the Hawaiian art of storytelling. She ran her mother Louise's Waikiki hula studio for three decades. The storytelling culture of Hawaii was expressed as entertainment in the royal courts and the private homes of the ancient Hawaiians. It came in an era before the written word was used as a method of preserving the histories, genealogies, and mythologies of the Hawaiian people. Winona  Beamer brought international attention to the hula and other forms of Hawaiian storytelling through music and the Native Hawaiian arts.

In 2000, Beamer alongside her hānai daughter Maile Beamer Loo formed the Hula Preservation Society (HPS), a non-profit dedicated to interviewing, videotaping, and perpetuating hula's most respected elders, capturing their knowledge, memories and stories.  As of 2020, HPS has continued with Beamer's vision of perpetuating the rich culture, history and knowledge of hula and hula practitioners; interviewing almost a 100 hula elders, expert hula practitioners who had been born before 1930.  Through the years, HPS has conducted not only one-on-one oral histories but also presented public panel discussions with beloved hula elders; resulting in a Hula Library of Ancient Hula types, implement and instrument types, chants, and kūpuna hula.

Kamehameha Schools Bishop Estate

Winona Beamer had been the Hawaiian culture instructor at the Kamehameha Schools when the curriculum became in danger of being cut. She wrote a May 1997 letter to the Hawaii Supreme Court, expressing her concerns, and asking for the resignation of trustee Lokelani Lindsey. Beamer became the catalyst for a groundswell that led to an investigation of the Kamehameha Schools Bishop Estate trust. Her letter resulted in a public outcry over the management of the estate trust.

In November 1997, Beamer joined Isabella Aiona Abbott, Gladys A. Brandt, Roderick F. McPhee, and Winona Ellis Rubin in releasing a public statement calling for the removal of Lindsey from the Kamehameha Schools Bishop Estate. The statement was published in the Honolulu Star-Bulletin as part of its coverage of the investigation into the management of the trust. The investigation led to an investigation by the Hawaii attorney general, a reorganization of the trust, and the resignation of Lindsey.

Death and legacy
She became known as Auntie Nona in Hawaii, and was a champion of teaching authentic Hawaiian culture. In the course of her life, she published multiple books, music scores, and audio and video recordings. In 1983, she and Richard Towill formed Ka Himeni Ana to encourage participation in authentic Hawaiian music. Beamer moved to Lahaina, on the island of Maui, in 2006. On April 10, 2008, she died in her sleep in Lahaina. She was survived by her musician sons Keola and Kapono, her only grandchild, Kamanamaikalani Beamer, and two Hānai (adopted, extended family) children: a daughter, Maile Loo Beamer, and a son, Kaliko Beamer-Trapp.

On August 27, 2020 a documentary titled Hawaiina was released about Beamer.

Author bibliography, discography and filmography

Books
, 
 , 
 ,

Musical scores
 Songs for Hawaiʻi's Sunbeamers (1980–1981) Beamer Hawaiʻiana, Winona Desha Beamer, 
 Traditional Chants and Hulas (1982) Beamer Hawaiʻiana, Winona Desha Beamer, Keʻala Brunke 
 Na Mele Hula. : a Collection of 33 Hula Chants (1987) Institute for Polynesian Studies, Brigham Young University, Hawaiʻi Campus ; Honolulu, Hawaii : Distributed for the Institute for Polynesian Studies by the University of Hawaii Press, Winona Desha Beamer

Audio
"Songs for keikis (children)" (date unknown) Waikiki Records, 45 RPM, Winona Desha Beamer, Pauline Kekahuna, Hauoli Girls, 
 Nona Beamer (1972) Custom Fidelity, LP, Winona Desha Beamer, 
 The Menehune of Hawaii : the little people of Hawaiian legend  (1982) Kalmar Records, LP, Winona Desha Beamer, Doug Hodge, 
 Ancient Hawaiian Musical Instruments (1982) Kalmar Records, LP, Winona Desha Beamer 
 Na Mele Hula. : Volume 1 a Collection of 33 Hula Chants (1987) Beamer Hawaiʻiana, Audio cassette tape, Winona Desha Beamer, 

 Hawaii 98 (1998) MGC Record, Compilation CD, Winona Desha Beamer and various artists 
 
 Island dreams (2004) Koto World, LP, Winona Desha Beamer, Dragonfly 
 We are ʻohana : Songs of Hope (2004) Winona Desha Beamer, Kaliko Beamer-Trapp, James McWhinney, Bruddah Kuz, Damon Williams, Faith Rivera, Rupert Tripp, Jr, Keola Beamer, Glynn Motoishi, Howard Shapiro

Video

Family tree

References

1923 births
2008 deaths
People from Oahu
People from Lahaina, Hawaii
People of the Territory of Hawaii
Hawaiian songwriters
Musicians from Hawaii
20th-century American musicians
Native Hawaiian musicians